"Give Me a Reason" is a song by Dutch duo The Common Linnets (Ilse DeLange and Waylon), it was released as the second single from their debut studio album The Common Linnets (2014). The song was released in the Netherlands as a digital download on 11 September 2014 through Universal Music Group. The song peaked at number 92 on the Dutch Singles Chart.

Music video
A music video to accompany the release of "Give Me a Reason" was first released onto YouTube on 11 September 2014 at a total length of three minutes and forty-six seconds.

Track listing

Chart performance

Weekly charts

Release history

References

2014 songs
2014 singles
The Common Linnets songs
Universal Music Group singles